The University of Applied Sciences Campus Vienna (UAS Campus Vienna, German: Fachhochschule Campus Wien or FH Campus Wien) is the largest university of applied sciences in Austria. It is located in the capital city Vienna, has about 6,000 students and offers 64 study programmes which are divided in seven departments.

References 

Universities of Applied Sciences in Austria
Favoriten